Lindholmen Castle is a castle  ruins at Lidköping Municipality in Västra Götaland County, Sweden.

History
Lindholmen was first mentioned in 1514. The property was made a manor house in 1516.
Vice Admiral Bengt Gabrielsson Oxenstierna  (1623–1702) rebuilt the courtyard into a large fortified castle.
In 1792, the castle burned to the ground and now only a 17th-century wing  remain.

See also
Lindholmen Castle

References

 

Castles in Västra Götaland County
Ruins in Sweden